An Old Time Christmas is the fourth studio album and the first Christmas album released by country music artist Randy Travis. The album was certified Gold by the RIAA. Randy Travis released a deluxe edition of his classic Christmas album An Old Time Christmas on November 19, 2021 featuring three never-before-released songs. The album, originally released in 1989, is the first Christmas record Travis ever released, kicking off his longtime association with the Holiday season.

Track listing
 "An Old Time Christmas" (Stewart Harris) - 3:13
 "Winter Wonderland" (Felix Bernard, Dick Smith) - 2:22
 "Meet Me Under the Mistletoe" (Joe Collins, Mark Irwin, Betsy Jackson) - 2:43
 "White Christmas Makes Me Blue" (Rich Grissom, Neil Patton Rogers) - 3:25
 "Santa Claus Is Coming to Town" (J. Fred Coots, Haven Gillespie) - 2:05
 "God Rest Ye Merry Gentlemen" (Traditional) - 2:45
 "Pretty Paper" (Willie Nelson) - 2:38
 "Oh, What a Silent Night" (Mark Collie, Kathy Louvin) - 2:32
 "How Do I Wrap My Heart Up for Christmas" (Paul Overstreet, Randy Travis) - 2:47
 "The Christmas Song" (Mel Tormé, Robert Wells) - 3:16

2021 Remastered Deluxe
 "An Old Time Christmas" (Stewart Harris) - 3:18
 "Winter Wonderland" (Felix Bernard, Dick Smith) - 2:23
 "Meet Me Under the Mistletoe" (Joe Collins, Mark Irwin, Betsy Jackson) - 2:41
 "White Christmas Makes Me Blue" (Rich Grissom, Neil Patton Rogers) - 3:25
 "Santa Claus Is Coming to Town" (J. Fred Coots, Haven Gillespie) - 2:05
 "God Rest Ye Merry Gentlemen" (Traditional) - 2:52
 "Pretty Paper" (Willie Nelson) - 2:38
 "Oh, What a Silent Night" (Mark Collie, Kathy Louvin) - 2:35
 "How Do I Wrap My Heart Up for Christmas" (Paul Overstreet, Randy Travis) - 2:46
 "The Christmas Song" (Mel Tormé, Robert Wells) - 3:21
 "Little Toy Trains (From The Vault)" (Roger Miller), - 2:24
 "There's A New Kid In Town (From The Vault)" (Curly Putman, Don Cook, Keith Whitley), - 3:48
 "White Christmas (From The Vault)" (Irving Berlin), - 3:26

Personnel

 Baillie & the Boys - background vocals
 Eddie Bayers - drums
 Dennis Burnside - keyboards
 Larry Byrom - acoustic guitar
 Mark Casstevens - acoustic guitar
 Carol Chase - background vocals
 Jerry Douglas - dobro
 Steve Gibson - bouzouki, acoustic guitar, electric guitar
 Doyle Grisham - steel guitar
 Sherilyn Huffman - background vocals
 David Hungate - bass guitar
 Teddy Irwin - acoustic guitar
 Greg Jennings - electric guitar
 Kirk "Jelly Roll" Johnson - harmonica
 Wendy Suits Johnson - background vocals
 Jerry Kroon - drums
 Larrie Londin - drums
 Terry McMillan - harmonica, percussion
 Brent Mason - electric guitar
 Farrell Morris - percussion
 Mark O'Connor - fiddle
 Hargus "Pig" Robbins - keyboards
 Lisa Silver - background vocals
 James Stroud - drums
 Randy Travis - acoustic guitar, lead vocals
 Dianne Vanette - background vocals
 Cindy Richardson-Walker - background vocals
 Jack Williams - bass guitar

Charts

Weekly charts

Year-end charts

References

1989 Christmas albums
Christmas albums by American artists
Randy Travis albums
Warner Records albums
Albums produced by Kyle Lehning
Country Christmas albums